Yevheniya Mykhaylivna Dembska (28 November 1920 – 29 June 2019) was a Ukrainian theatre and cinema actress.

Personal life and death

Yevheniya Mykhaylivna Dembska was born in Kiev to a musical family with three daughters - Yevheniya (also transcribed as Yevgeniya or Eugenia) and her two sisters, Valentina and Neonila. At the age of three, she lost her father. Her first husband, pianist Alexander Katz, was called up to the Red Army in 1939 and died in the liberation of Kiev. She graduated from the Kiev Musical College (1939), she studied at the Kiev Conservatory (1939-1941). Since 1940 - soloist of the Kiev theater of small forms. She got into occupation during the Great Patriotic War. In the theater "Klein Kunst Theater" she performed in 1945.

At the end of the war, together with the troupe, she ended up in Hungary, and appeared before Soviet soldiers. She moved to Lviv, performed in the repatriate club. She graduated from the Lviv Conservatory (1946), performed with Mikhail Vodyan in concerts as a soloist of the Lviv Philharmonic, in 1946 participated in the creation of the Lviv Theater of Musical Comedy. In 1953, together with the theater, she moved to Odessa, the leading soloist of the Odessa Academic Theater of Musical Comedy. She appeared in films from 1957 to 2019. Her second husband was Alexey Petrovich Krinitsky, a lawyer.

Dembska died on 29 June 2019 in Odessa, aged 99. She was buried on 1 July at the Second Christian Cemetery of Odessa.

References

External links
 

1920 births
2019 deaths
Ukrainian stage actresses
Actors from Kyiv
Soviet actresses
Recipients of the title of Merited Artist of Ukraine